David Ramirez is an American Americana musician from Austin, Texas.

Career
Ramirez has released six full-length albums. The first two, American Soil (2009) and Apologies (2012), were self-released. Thirty Tigers released his third, Fables, in 2015, fourth, We're Not Going Anywhere in 2017, and fifth album, My Love is a Hurricane in 2020.

Discography 

Studio albums
 American Soil (2009, self-released)
 Apologies (2012, self-released)
 Fables (2015, Thirty Tigers)
 We're Not Going Anywhere (2017, Thirty Tigers)
 My Love is a Hurricane (2020, Thirty Tigers)
 Backslider (2021, Sweetworld)

EPs
 Strangetown  EP (2011, self-released)
 The Rooster  EP (2013, self-released)

Collaborations
 Glorietta (2018, Bread & Butter)  Glorietta (w/Noah Gundersen, Matthew Logan Vasquez, Kelsey Wilson, Adrian Quesada, Jason Robert Blum).

References

Musicians from Texas
Living people
Year of birth missing (living people)